Tides of Passion is a 1925 American silent drama film directed by J. Stuart Blackton and starring Mae Marsh, Ben Hendricks Jr. and Laska Winter.

Cast
 Mae Marsh as Charity 
 Ben Hendricks Jr. as William Pennland 
 Laska Winter as Hagar 
 Earl Schenck as Jonas 
 Ivor McFadden as Alick 
 Thomas R. Mills as Michael

References

Bibliography
 Munden, Kenneth White. The American Film Institute Catalog of Motion Pictures Produced in the United States, Part 1. University of California Press, 1997.

External links

1925 films
1925 drama films
Silent American drama films
American silent feature films
1920s English-language films
Vitagraph Studios films
Films directed by J. Stuart Blackton
American black-and-white films
Films based on Canadian novels
1920s American films